Landenberg is an unincorporated community in southern Chester County, Pennsylvania, United States.  It is, essentially, a post office address that covers parts of New Garden, London Britain and Franklin Townships. The White Clay Creek (and preserve) bisects Landenberg. Landenberg falls into two school districts: Avon Grove and Kennett Consolidated.  There are several historical areas in Landenberg, including the Landenberg community (store, church, apartments, hotel) and the Ticking Tomb along with the bridge in New Garden Township.

Formerly part of the range of the Lenape tribe of Native Americans, the White Clay Creek runs through Landenberg, eventually entering the nearby White Clay Creek Preserve. Landenberg is home to many businesspersons who commute to work in the nearby city of Wilmington, Delaware.

Landenberg once had a railroad station that was shared between the Pennsylvania Railroad and the Delaware Western Railroad, a system acquired by the Baltimore and Ohio Railroad. Landenberg's proximity to the White Clay Creek Preserve makes this area a favorite for local fisherman, hikers, bikers and outdoorsmen. White Clay Creek Preserve backs up to the White Clay Creek State Park in Delaware.

Landenberg was named for Martin Landenberger, who operated a mill there.

Climate

References

 Unincorporated communities in Chester County, Pennsylvania
 Unincorporated communities in Pennsylvania